Stephen Mukatuka (born 19 December 1998) is a Zimbabwean footballer who plays as a defender for Mbabane Swallows and the Zimbabwe national football team.

Career
On 31 January 2019, Mukatuka joined Mbabane Swallows in Eswatini.

References

External links

1998 births
Living people
CAPS United players
AmaZulu F.C. players
Zimbabwe Premier Soccer League players
South African Premier Division players
Zimbabwean footballers
Zimbabwe international footballers
Association football defenders
Sportspeople from Masvingo
Zimbabwe A' international footballers
2016 African Nations Championship players